The Museu de les Ciències Príncipe Felipe (anglicised as "Science Museum Príncipe Felipe") is a science museum in Valencia, Spain. It is part of the City of Arts and Sciences, an architectural complex within the city and can be found at the end of Luis García Berlanga Street. Its director is Manuel Toharia, a Spanish science writer and television personality.

Its construction started around 1994, it was symbolically inaugurated in March 2000 by Felipe VI, and it opened on 13 November 2000 with an investment of 26 million pesetas.

The purpose of the museum is to have interactive exhibitions and temporary collections related to science and technology without valuable items. Some scenes from the film Tomorrowland (2015) were filmed at the City of Arts and Sciences, including some shots on the museum's cantilever.

Gallery

References

External links

 

Museu de les Ciencies Principe Felipe
Museums in Valencia
Science museums in Spain
Museu de les Ciencies Principe Felipe
Museums established in 2000
Museu de les Ciencies Principe Felipe